The following were the events of Gymnastics for the year 2014 throughout the world.
 February 21 – December 6: 2014 FIG Calendar

Artistic gymnastics
 March 1: AT&T American Cup World Cup 2014 in  Greensboro, North Carolina
 Men's winner:  Sam Mikulak
 Women's winner:  Elizabeth Price
 March 13 – 16: 2014 Turnier der Meister World Challenge Cup (#1) in  Cottbus
 Host nation,  won both the gold medal tally. It and  tied the overall medal tally, with 5 medals each.
 March 24 – April 1: 2014 African Gymnastics Championships in  Pretoria
 Host nation, won the gold medal tally.  won the overall medal tally.
 March 26 – 28: 2014 FIG World Challenge Cup #2 in  Doha
  won both the gold tally. However, it and  tied in the overall medal tally with 4 medals each.
 April 5 & 6: 2014 Tokyo Cup
 Men:  Kōhei Uchimura
 Women:  Vanessa Ferrari
 April 18 – 20: 2014 FIG World Challenge Cup #3 in  Ljubljana
  and host nation, won 3 gold medals each. However, the Netherlands won the overall medal tally.
 April 25 – 27: 2014 FIG World Challenge Cup #4 in  Osijek
 Host nation, won the gold medal tally. Croatia, and  won four overall medals each.
 May 29 – June 1: 2014 FIG World Challenge Cup #5 in  Anadia
 The  won both the gold and overall medal tallies.
 August 17 – 24: 2014 Summer Youth Olympics (artistic)
 Boys' All-Around Artistic Gymnastics:   Giarnni Regini-Moran;   Nikita Nagornyy;   Alec Yoder
 Girls' All-Around Artistic Gymnastics:   Seda Tutkhalyan;   Flavia Lopes Saraiva;   Elissa Downie
 Boys' Individual Events:  and  won 3 gold medals and 5 overall medals each.
 Girls' Individual Events:  and  won 2 gold medals each. However,  won the overall medal tally.
 August 23 & 24: 2014 FIG World Challenge Cup #6 in  Ghent
 Cancelled. 
 October 3 – 12: 2014 World Artistic Gymnastics Championships in  Nanning
 The  won both the gold and overall medal tallies.
 November 7 – 9: 2014 FIG World Challenge Cup #7 (final) in  Medellín
  won the gold medal tally. Host nation, won the overall medal tally.
 November 29 & 30: 2014 FIG EnBW World Cup in  Stuttgart
 Men's All-Around winner:  Oleh Vernyayev
 Women's All-Around winner:  Larisa Iordache
 Men's team winners: 
 Women's team winners: 
 December 6: 2014 FIG World Cup in  Glasgow
 Men's All-Around winner:  Yusuke Tanaka
 Men's Vault winner:  Yuya Komoto
 Men's Rings winner:  Yuya Komoto
 Men's Pommel Horse winner:  Oleh Vernyayev
 Men's Parallel Bars winner:  Oleh Vernyayev
 Men's High Bar winner:  Yusuke Tanaka
 Men's Floor winner:  Yusuke Tanaka
 Women's All-Around winner:  Larisa Iordache
 Women's Vault winner:  Larisa Iordache
 Women's Uneven Bars winner:  Jessica López
 Women's Floor winner:  Larisa Iordache
 Women's Beam winner:  Larisa Iordache
 August 19 – September 1: UPAG American Championships 2014 in  Mississauga
 Men's Individual All Around winner:  Jossimar Calvo
 Men's Team All Around winners:  Sean Melton / C.J. Maestas / Marvin Kimble / Jonathan Horton / Brandon Wynn / Eddie Penev
 Women's Individual All Around winner:  Mykayla Skinner
 Women's Team All Around winner:  Mykayla Skinner / Maggie Nichols / Madison Desch / Amelia Hundley / Madison Kocian / Ashton Locklear

Rhythmic gymnastics
 2014 Rhythmic Gymnastics World Cup Series
 February 21 – 24: 2014 Asian Junior Championships in  Kuala Lumpur
  won both the gold and overall medal tallies.
 March 14 – 16: 2014 World Cup #1 in  Debrecen
 Overall individual winner:  Aleksandra Soldatova
 Overall group winner: 
 March 22 & 23: 2014 Gazprom World Cup (#2) in  Stuttgart
 Overall individual winner:  Yana Kudryavtseva
 Overall group winner: 
 March 24 – April 1: 2014 African Gymnastics Championships
 Overall individual winner:  Grace Legote
 Overall group winner: 
 April 3 – 6: 2014 World Cup #3 in  Lisbon
 Overall individual winner:  Son Yeon-jae
 Overall group winner: 
 April 11 – 13: 2014 World Cup #4 in  Pesaro
 Overall individual winner:  Yana Kudryavtseva
 Overall group winner: 
 May 9 – 11: 2014 World Cup #5 in  Corbeil-Essonnes
 Overall individual winner:  Margarita Mamun
 May 22 – 24: 2014 World Cup #6 in  Tashkent
 Overall individual winner:  Margarita Mamun
 Overall group winner: 
 May 30 – June 1: 2014 BelSwissBank World Cup (#7) in  Minsk
 Overall individual winner:  Yana Kudryavtseva
 Overall group winner: 
 June 10 – 15: 2014 Rhythmic Gymnastics European Championships in  Baku
 Overall individual winner:  Yana Kudryavtseva
 Overall group winner: 
 August 9 & 10: 2014 Dundee World Cup (#8) in  Sofia
 Overall individual winner:  Yana Kudryavtseva
 Overall group winner: 
 August 26 & 27: 2014 Summer Youth Olympics (rhythmic)
 Individual All-Around:   Irina Annenkova;   Mariya Trubach;   Laura Zeng
 Group All-Around:  ;  ;   
 September 5 – 7: 2014 World Cup #9 (final) in  Kazan
 Overall individual winner:  Yana Kudryavtseva
 Overall group winner: 
 September 21 – 28: 2014 World Rhythmic Gymnastics Championships in  İzmir
  won both the gold and overall medal tallies.
 August 19 – September 1: UPAG American Championships 2014 in  Mississauga
 Women's Individual All Around winner:  Jasmine Kerber
 Women's Groups All Around winners:  Beatriz Francisco / Elaine Sampaio / Francielly Pereira / Gabrielle Silva / Isadora Silva / Mayra Gmach

Trampolining/Tumbling
 April 9 – 12: 2014 European Trampoline Championships in  Guimarães
  won both the gold and overall medal tallies.
 June 27 & 28: 2014 World Cup #1 in  Arosa
 Ladies' Open -> Gold:  Li Dan; Silver:  Yana Pavlova; Bronze:  Hanna Harchonak
 Men's Open -> Gold:  Tu Xiao; Silver:  Uladzislau Hancharou; Bronze:  Dong Dong
 Ladies' Synchro -> Gold:  Li Dan & Zhong Xingping; Silver:  Ekaterina Khilko & Anna Kasparyan; Bronze:  Hanna Harchonak & Maryia Lon
 Men's Synchro -> Gold:  Dong Dong & Tu Xiao; Silver:  Sergei Azarian & Mikhail Melnik; Bronze:  Bartlomiej Hes & Lukasz Tomaszewski
 August 21 & 22: 2014 Summer Youth Olympics (trampoline)
 Boys' Individual:   Dylan Schmidt;   LIU Changxin;   Pedro Ribeiro Ferreira
 Girls' Individual:   ZHU Xueying;   Rana Nakano;   Maria Zakharchuk
 September 5 & 6: 2014 World Cup #2 in  Loulé
 Men's Individual -> Gold:  GAO Lei; Silver:  TU Xiao; Bronze:  Mikhail Melnik
 Women's Individual -> Gold:  LI Dan; Silver:  Bryony Page; Bronze:  Ayana Yamada
 Men's Synchro -> Gold:  Dong Dong and TU Xiao; Silver:  Mikhail Melnik and Sergei Azarian; Bronze:  Ilya Grishunin and Oleg Piunov
 Women's Synchro -> Gold:  Silvia Saiote and Beatriz Martins; Silver:  Fanny Chilo and Sylvie Wirth; Bronze:  Kirsten Boersma and Pascaline Wiebering
 Men's Individual Tumbling -> Gold:  Kristof Willerton; Silver:  MENG Wenchao; Bronze:  Grigory Noskov
 Women's Individual Tumbling -> Gold:  JIA Fangfang; Silver:  Lucie Colebeck; Bronze:  Racheal Letsche 
 September 12 & 13: 2014 World Cup #3 in  Minsk
 Men's Individual -> Gold:  Dmitry Ushakov; Silver:  Tetsuya Sotomura; Bronze:      Uladzislau Hancharou
 Women's Individual -> Gold:  Charlotte Drury; Silver:  Hanna Harchonak; Bronze:  Tatsiana Piatrenia
 Men's Synchro -> Gold:  Sergei Azarian and Mikhail Melnik; Silver:  Uladzislau Hancharou and Mikalai Kazak; Bronze:  Shaun and Ty Swadling
 Women's Synchro -> Gold:  Rosie MacLennan and Samantha Sendel; Silver:  Beatriz Martins and Silvia Saiote; Bronze:  Shaylee Dunavin and Charlotte Drury
 Men's Individual Tumbling -> Gold:  Alexandr Mironov; Silver:  Dzmitry Darashuk; Bronze:  Jonathon Schwaiger
 Women's Individual Tumbling -> Gold:  Jordan Sugrim; Silver:  Ekaterina Gaas; Bronze:  Emily Smith
 November 7 – 9: 2014 Trampoline World Championships in  Daytona Beach, Florida
  won both the gold and overall medal tallies.
 August 19 – September 1: UPAG American Championships 2014 in  Mississauga
 Men's Individual Trampoline winner:  Jason Burnett
 Women's Individual Trampoline winner:  Rosie MacLennan

References

 
Gymnastics by year